The Lover in Me may refer to:
The Lover in Me (album), a 1988 album by Sheena Easton
"The Lover in Me" (song), the title track
"The Lover in Me", a 2006 song by Jessica Simpson from her album A Public Affair